Vincenzo "Vince" Guzzo  (born 11 June 1969) is a Canadian entrepreneur, philanthropist and television personality. He currently serves as CEO of Cinémas Guzzo, Groupe Guzzo Construction inc., Guzzo Medical and Guzzo Hospitality. He has also opened a chain of Neapolitan pizzerias called Giulietta in Montreal. He and his wife raise money for charities through the Guzzo Family Foundation. Guzzo was a recipient of the Queen Elizabeth II Diamond Jubilee Medal in 2012, he was knighted by the Order of Merit of the Italian Republic and is a member of the Order of Malta.

In 2018 Guzzo joined the cast of the CBC Television business reality show Dragons' Den as one of the investor "Dragons" in season 13 and season 14.

Early life

Guzzo was born on 11 June 1969 in Montreal, the only son of Italian immigrants. Guzzo attended Selwyn House School, a private boys' school in Westmount, Quebec, where his classmates included Greg Fergus, Mark Pathy and Michael Penner. A 19 September 2018 profile in the Montreal Gazette talks about his early life:As a student at Selwyn House School, Guzzo would do his homework in his father’s office at the movie theatre. He later worked as an usher, and then in other capacities in the business.He studied economics at Western University in London, Ontario, and law at Université de Québec à Montréal.

Business career

Cinémas Guzzo 

Guzzo is the president and CEO of Cinémas Guzzo—the largest movie operator in Quebec, with 141 screens and 10 locations, and the third-largest in Canada. His new cinema Méga-Plex St-Jean 12 is currently being built, scheduled to open in 2021.

Cinémas Guzzo was started by his father, Angelo Guzzo, who remains chairman of the board. He came to Canada from Italy in 1967 and worked as a machinist for Pratt & Whitney. In 1974, he bought a movie theatre, the Cinéma Paradis, which had been closed and left abandoned for the previous ten years, creating friction with the local citizens. Vincenzo Guzzo worked as an usher and in other small roles as a student. In 1991 he joined his father in the family business. As the chain expanded in the late 1990s and new locations were established, the construction division of Cinémas Guzzo did the building and Guzzo helped with the design work.

Other businesses 
Vincenzo Guzzo is also CEO for the following companies:
Club discotheque L'astre 5
Groupe Guzzo Construction Inc.
 Guzzo Hospitality
 Guzzo Medical Services Inc.
Cinémas Guzzo Les Films Inc.

All of the cinemas owned by Cinémas Guzzo were built by Le Groupe Guzzo Construction Inc. Guzzo also owns a chain of Neapolitan pizzerias called Giulietta.

In May 2019, Guzzo submitted a bid to purchase the Montreal Alouettes of the Canadian Football League. He later pulled out of the running to buy the team, citing "personal conflicts with people around the deal." Guzzo later tweeted in a series of threads that he did not believe that CFL commissioner Randy Ambrosie knew what he was doing during negotiations and acted "in a non transparent way and wasted my time."

Guzzo has also been President of APCQ (L'Association des propriétaires de cinémas du Québec)—an association of Québec cinema owners—since 2012.

Media

Dragons' Den

Guzzo joined the cast of the CBC Television business reality show Dragons' Den as one of the investor "Dragons" for season 13. The first episode of season 13 including the two new "Dragons" Vincenzo Guzzo and Lane Merrifield aired on September 20, 2018. Dragons' Den is a Canadian TV show on the CBC Television network, with an average of 519,000 viewers per episode in the 2017–2018 season.

Other media appearances

Vincenzo Guzzo has made the following additional media appearances:

 Canadian French language television channel Ici Radio-Canada Télé talk show Tout le monde en parle on 9 February 2014.
 Interviewed on Canadian French language digital radio channel Ici Radio-Canada.ca's show Culture Club, broadcast on 31 January 2016.
Interviewed on CTV's entertainment television news show eTalk, broadcast January 11, 2019.

Personal life

Vincenzo Guzzo has five children (Angelo, Vittorio Emanuele, Vito, Delano and Rossella). Maria heads the Guzzo Family Foundation, founded in 2007, which raises money for the Jewish General Hospital, the Shriners Hospital and Youth Mental Health. Guzzo holds both Canadian and Italian citizenships.

The CBC Dragon's Den blog explains: He and his wife, Maria, are renowned philanthropists, giving generously to numerous hospitals and culminating in the establishment of the Guzzo Family Foundation in 2007, which is aggressively invested in cancer nanotechnology research at Montreal’s Jewish General Hospital and McGill University. Guzzo’s contributions have been internationally recognized as he is the recipient of the Queen’s Diamond Jubilee Medal, was knighted by the Order of Merit of the Italian Republic and is a distinguished member of the Order of Malta.  

Guzzo is nicknamed "Mr. Sunshine", and his outfits usually display that with wearing the colour yellow, stating, "Remember something... The sun can be warm and comforting — but if you get too close, it could burn you."

Awards and honours

Queen's Diamond Jubilee Medal (2012)
Order of Merit of the Italian Republic
Order of Malta
Canada's Top 40 Under 40 - 2002 honouree

References

External links
Official website
Cinémas Guzzo website
Giulietta Pizzeria Napoletana website 
Dragon's Den (CBC TV)

 "Guzzo powered La Notte in Bianco event benefits JGH, Shriners and Youth Mental Health". The Suburban. 12 September 2018. Retrieved 2018-11-21.
"Three takeaways from Vincenzo Guzzo’s talk at the Chamber". Blog post. The Chamber of Commerce of Metropolitan Montreal. 8 December 2017. Retrieved 2018-11-21.
 "Vincent Guzzo vient lancer les travaux de son cinéma". Le Canada Français (in French). 12 October 2017. Retrieved 2018-11-21.
 "Décrépitude du cinéma Paradis : les citoyens en ont assez" 

Anglophone Quebec people
Canadian Broadcasting Corporation people
Businesspeople from Montreal
Canadian chairpersons of corporations
Living people
Participants in Canadian reality television series
1969 births
Canadian people of Italian descent
Recipients of the Order of Merit of the Italian Republic